Kusheshwar Asthan Assembly constituency or  Kusheshwar Asthan is an assembly constituency in Darbhanga district in the Indian state of Bihar. It is reserved for scheduled castes.

Overview
As per Delimitation of Parliamentary and Assembly constituencies Order, 2008, No. 78 Kusheshwar Asthan Assembly constituency (SC) is composed of the following: Kusheshwar Asthan and Kusheshwar Asthan Purbi community development blocks; Uchhti, Afzala, Akbarpur Baink, Sonpur Paghari, Ganaura Tarwara, Ladaho, Pokhram North and Pokhram South of Biraul CD Block.

Kusheshwar  Asthan Assembly constituency (SC) is part of No. 23 Samastipur (Lok Sabha constituency) (SC).

Members of Legislative Assembly

^-bypoll

Election results

2021 By election

2020

2015

2010

References

External links
 

Assembly constituencies of Bihar
Politics of Darbhanga district